Horses Galore is a BBC1 children's TV programme broadcast between 1977 and 1979. The theme tune was Pulstar from the album Albedo 0.39 by Vangelis (an edited version, as released on the 4-track EP, "Vangelis"). The presenter was Susan King.

1977 British television series debuts
1979 British television series endings
1970s British children's television series
BBC children's television shows
English-language television shows